Maquira is a genus of trees in the family Moraceae, native to South America.

Taxonomy 
The genus Maquira contains the following species:

 Maquira calophylla (Poepp. & Endl.) C.C.Berg
 Maquira coriacea C.C.Berg
 Maquira guianensis Aubl.
 Maquira sclerophylla (Ducke) C.C.Berg

References

Moraceae
Moraceae genera